Galway Wind Park is Ireland's largest onshore wind farm. Located in Connemara's Cloosh Valley west of Moycullen, County Galway. The wind park was co-developed by SSE Renewables and Coillte at a cost of €280 million and consists of 58 Siemens 3 MW SWT-3.0-101 wind turbines. The wind park provides energy to around 89,000 homes, which is equivalent to 80% of the homes in Galway.

Development 
The project was developed over two phases and includes four permitted wind farms which are Galway Cloosh, Lettercraffroe, Seecon and Uggool. Phase one of the project consists of 22 turbines located on the Uggool and Lettercraffroe sites and began construction in 2015. It was developed and financed solely by SSE Renewables and consists of 22 turbines. Phase two was developed and financed through a joint venture between SSE Renewables and Coillte. The second phase consists of 36 turbines located at the Cloosh and Seecon sites.

The Port of Galway was used in the development of the wind park, and turbine tops, hubs and blades were offloaded in the port and transported to the site by tucks during the night. The 55 meter long blades were among some of the largest in the industry at the time of construction and a section of the Lough Atalia Road which passed under the rail bridge had to be lowered in order to facilitate the transportation of the turbine blades.

Generated electricity is sent to the nearby Uggool substation where the voltage is increased to 110kV.  An underground power cable joins the Galway-Screeb 110kV overhead line and connects the wind park with the electrical grid.

See also 

 Wind power in Ireland
 List of wind farms in the Republic of Ireland

References

External links 

 

Wind farms in the Republic of Ireland